"Dreaming With My Eyes Open" is a song written by Tony Arata and recorded by American country music singer Clay Walker. It was released on May 27, 1994 as the fourth and final single from his self-titled debut album, and was featured in the soundtrack to the film The Thing Called Love. The song reached the top of the Billboard Hot Country Singles & Tracks (now Hot Country Songs) chart.

Background
During an interview, Walker stated, "On my very first CD there was a song called "Dreaming with My Eyes Open"—an up-tempo, fast-beat song. I almost considered not recording it. It didn't strike me as a song I could sing great, but my producer talked me into it. It became one of the most played songs of that year, and today, every time I sing it, it gets more and more special to me. It says I'm going to do my dreaming with my eyes wide open. That's what we all have to do with MS. Dreaming with eyes open is a vision. When you close 'em, it's just a dream."

Critical reception
Larry Flick of Billboard wrote "Walker has played a hell of a good game at radio, and urged along by a relentless rhythm track, he hits this one right out of the park. It'll take a few more innings to know for sure, but with the right coaching Walker could become the next country music MVP."

Tara Seetharam of Country Universe listed "Dreaming with My Eyes Open" as the 392nd best country single of the 1990s and wrote, "His infectious pledge to live in the moment is as effective as country’s finest inspirational ballads because it’s firmly grounded in reality."

Music video
The music video was directed by Michael Merriman, and premiered in mid-1994. It features Walker playing outside a BBQ restaurant south of Austin, Texas near a dirt road waiting for a ride. Eventually a woman in a pickup truck picks him up and they drive down rural roads. They reach a farm where they are goofing off together while Walker plays guitar for the woman.

Charts
The song debuted at No. 51 on the Hot Country Singles & Tracks chart dated June 11, 1994. It charted for 20 weeks on that chart, reaching number one on the chart dated August 27, 1994, marking Walker's third number-one single.

Weekly charts

Year-end charts

References

Songs about dreams
1994 singles
1993 songs
Clay Walker songs
Songs written by Tony Arata
Song recordings produced by James Stroud
Giant Records (Warner) singles